Taurano is a village and comune in the province of Avellino, in the Campania region of southern Italy.

Geography
The town lies in the Lauro Valley. It is bordered by Lauro, Monteforte Irpino, Moschiano, Pago del Vallo di Lauro and Visciano .

History
Bronze Age remains have been found in the area of Taurano, whose name derives from Latin, either the surname Taurus or the gentilic Taurius. It was a Samnite oppidum, destroyed by Romans under Sulla during the Social War. It later became a summer resort, and two Roman villas have been found from this period, one in Torre and one in San Giovanni in Palco.

In the Middle Ages it was part of the Feud of Lauro. Villagers throughout the valley sought refuge in the mountains during the barbarian invasions. Under the administrative reforms of Joachim Murat (King of Naples 1808–15), Taurano and the rest of the Lauro Valley became part of the province of Terra di Lavoro.

In the 19th century Taurano offered shelter to brigands such as Fra Diavolo, and anti-Bourbon conspirators such as Father Angelo Peluso.  After unification, Taurano become an autonomous Commune except for a brief interruption.

Notes and references

Cities and towns in Campania